The 2015–16 Albanian Basketball Superleague, is the 50th season of the top professional basketball league in Albania. The regular season started on 2 October 2015 and the defending champions were Vllaznia. The finals were contested between BC Teuta Durrës and the holders Vllaznia, with Vllaznia retaining their title on 1 June 2016.

Clubs and Arenas

Regular season

League table

|}
Source: Eurobasket

Playoffs

Source: Albaniansport

Statistics
Longest winning streak: 13 games (Kamza)
Longest losing streak: 15 games (Partizani)
Highest scoring game: Tirana 133–68 Flamurtari (16 April 2016)
Biggest home win: Tirana 133–68 Flamurtari (16 April 2016)
Biggest away win: Partizani 50–101 Tirana (27 March 2016)
Most wins: 18 (Kamza)
Fewest wins: 1 (Partizani)
Most points: 1945 (Vllaznia)
Fewest points: 1225 (Partizani)

External links
Albanian Basketball Federation site

Albania
Basketball
Basketball
Superleague